Rohr im Kremstal is a municipality in the district of Steyr-Land in the Austrian state of Upper Austria.

Geography
Rohr lies in the Traunviertel in the center of the fertile Krems valley, where the Sulzbach flows into the Krems river.

About 6 percent of the municipality is forest, and 83 percent is farmland.

References

Cities and towns in Steyr-Land District